Wild Things: Diamonds in the Rough (also known as Wild Things 3) is a 2005 erotic thriller film directed by Jay Lowi and starring Sandra McCoy, Sarah Laine, Linden Ashby, Dina Meyer and Brad Johnson. It is a sequel to Wild Things 2 (2004) and the third film in the Wild Things series.

Like the previous film, the film premiered on Encore Mystery on February 19, 2005, and was released on DVD on April 26.

Plot
Marie Clifton is set to inherit two beautiful diamonds, called the "mother and daughter", which her late mother bestowed to her. Marie's step-father, Jay Clifton, challenges the will, claiming that Marie isn't ready for the responsibility, but actually wants to take the diamonds for himself. At a sexual education seminar at Marie's school, physician Dr. Chad Johnson and probation officer Kristen Richards discuss sex crimes, and Richards reveals she was a victim of an anonymous rapist many years before.

At Marie's swim-meet, Jay encounters towel girl Elena Sandoval, and invites her to Marie's eighteenth birthday party. Elena attends the party but is assaulted by Marie, who says that Elena is not welcome. Jay comforts Elena, and brings her to the construction site of one of his buildings for privacy. Later, Elena alleges that Jay raped her at the site. Detective Michael Morrison is placed on the case, as is Richards, who is Elena's probation officer. Chad is placed in charge of documenting Elena's injuries, and testifies to the court that Elena was raped.

Marie believes that Elena is doing this for money and tells Jay to pay her off. When Jay admits that he's broke, Marie suggests that they sell the diamonds. Jay agrees, and revokes his claim to the will, giving Marie custody of the diamonds so she can sell them off. However, this was a ploy between Elena, Marie and Chad to get the diamonds, and the trio are in a sexual relationship together.

Jay believes that Elena will recant her accusation after being paid off, but at the next court session Elena testifies that Jay also threatened to kill her. Jay is sent to prison, but Richards is now suspicious of Elena's behavior. Richards and Morrison search Elena's trailer and discover she's gathered information about Kristen's rape, using it to form her testimony. Richards and Morrison discuss their suspicions with Jay, and conclude that Marie, Elena and Chad must be working together.

Chad is questioned by Richards and Morrison, and fears they suspect him. He turns on Marie, drugging her and stealing the diamonds. Marie and Elena give chase, following Chad into the woods, where Marie kills him with a tire iron. Marie then meets the diamond buyer Chad set up, but learns that the diamonds are fake. Elena, who is left to deal with Chad's body, is caught by Richards and Morrison.

Richards and Morrison give Elena a task: wear a wire and get Marie to admit she killed Chad, and the charges against Elena will be lessened. Elena goes to Marie and plays along with her plan to get the real diamonds from Jay's safe at the construction site. Throughout, Elena repeatedly tries to get Marie to confess, but is unsuccessful. When Marie and Elena finally get the diamonds from the safe, Elena pulls a gun on her and flees with the diamonds, prompting Marie to chase her with her own gun. Richards and Morrison, who are listening in from nearby, enter the construction site separately. During the hide-and-seek, Richards finds Marie and shoots her in the chest, killing her. Afterward, Elena claims there were no diamonds, and is escorted from the scene by Richards.

At the end, it's revealed that Richards and Elena are mother and daughter. Jay was the man that raped Kristen in the past, and Elena is their daughter. They dispose of him by dosing his drink and leaving him to fall to his death. During the credits, scenes are shown explaining how they managed to pull their plan off.

Cast

 Sandra McCoy as Elena Sandoval
 Sarah Laine as Marie Clifton
 Linden Ashby as Detective Michael Morrison
 Dina Meyer as Kristen Richards
 Brad Johnson as Jay Clifton
 Ron Melendez as Dr. Chad Johnson
 Michael Mantell as Theo Bloom
 Claire Coffee as Jenny Bellamy
 Nikki Griffin as Risa Howard
 Zakareth Ruben as Julie 
 Van Epperson as Principal Phillips 
 Maria Cina as Blonde Reporter 
 Kymberly Newberry as Judge Wilcox 
 Sandra Purpuro as D.A. Sarah Lovell  
 Gary Carlos Cervantes as Davros
 Paul Terrell Clayton as Dammers

References

External links
 
 

2005 direct-to-video films
2005 films
2000s erotic thriller films
Direct-to-video sequel films
Direct-to-video erotic thriller films
Television sequel films
American sexploitation films
American rape and revenge films
American LGBT-related films
Bisexuality-related films
Films set in Miami
Films shot in Florida
Films shot in Miami
Sony Pictures direct-to-video films
Destination Films films
Films directed by Andy Hurst
2000s American films